Mary Reynolds Babcock (August 8, 1908 – July 17, 1953) was an American philanthropist. As the daughter of R.J Reynolds and Katharine Smith Reynolds, she therefore inherited considerable wealth from her father's company, the nationally prominent R. J. Reynolds Tobacco Company. She was a founder for both the Z. Smith Reynolds Foundation and the Mary Reynolds Babcock Foundation. She and her husband Charles Babcock gifted Wake Forest University 350 acres, and the university moved to Winston-Salem, North Carolina.

Biography
Mary Reynolds Babcock was born in 1908 in Winston-Salem, North Carolina as the second child to tobacco tycoon R. J. Reynolds and his wife Katharine Smith Reynolds. She was preceded by her brother R.J. "Dick" Reynolds Jr; her younger siblings Nancy Susan Reynolds and Zachary Smith Reynolds followed in 1910 and 1911 respectively. The family lived at 666 W Fifth St in Winston-Salem in a palatial Queen Anne mansion, designed by architect George Franklin Barber. Fifth street was labeled as "Millionaire's Row" due to the number of Reynolds family members, high-ups in R.J. Reynolds tobacco company, and other tobacco or textile industrialists who lived there. The house was located conveniently to the offices of R.J. Reynolds Tobacco at the intersection of Fifth and Main.

While R.J. Reynolds worked regularly to continue building his tobacco empire, Katharine Reynolds fulfilled the role of a wealthy Southern wife through managing the household and regularly entertaining fellow Winston-Salem socialites. However, she also deviated from this role through her participation in business and local politics, joining the ranks of the New Women of the era. Prior to her marriage in 1905, she studied business at the State Normal and Industrial School in Greensboro, NC, although she would leave Normal and receive her bachelor's degree from Sullins College in Bristol, Virginia. After graduating, Katharine worked as R.J.'s stenographer and secretary, and he taught her to navigate the stock market. Through purchasing her own stocks, she was able to develop her own independent income; at a time when only 5% of men owned stock, and even less women, she was taking in $10,000 over a period of less than eighteen months. Her management and money skills allowed her to undertake extensive civic duties, such as the creation of a local YMCA chapter, in which she served as President, and Junior League. Her independent wealth, alongside that of her husband, allowed for her to participate extensively in philanthropy, donating generously to a variety of causes such as the creation of hospitals and orphanages.

Reynolda Estate Era
In addition to her familial, societal, and civic responsibilities, around 1905 Katharine Reynolds, with the full financial support of her husband, began to design her own estate of Reynolda. After buying over 1,000 acres of land north of Winston-Salem, she worked extensively with architects, landscape artists, and agriculture specialists to create not just a private house for her family, but also a self-sufficient model farm for exhibiting and educating on the most modern agriculture techniques. In the style of an English estate, a village with cottages provided for white workers was built; another community called "Five Row" was also built for black estate workers.

Construction of Reynolda House was officially completed in 1917, in time for the family to move in for the Christmas season. However, R.J. Reynolds was unable to enjoy it long, as he passed away July 1918 of suspected pancreatic cancer. Mary Reynolds was 9 years old. Shortly after in 1921, her mother remarried to J. Edward Johnston, a teacher who worked on the estate's private school and about 13 years Katharine's junior. Mary wrote in her diary after the marriage: "“At about 7:15, Mother was married to Mr. Johnston. The affair was very quiet. Smith was ring bearer, and Nancy and myself were flower girls. We are trying to keep it quiet, but about the [whole] town knows it.” 

In 1921, a playhouse was constructed for Mary and Nancy in the gardens adjoining the house. The building was designed to resemble an English cottage and furniture contained was at smaller size for the young girls. Friends of Mary and Nancy interviewed in 1980 remembered having sleepovers in the playhouse. Aurelia Spaugh recalled: "We also used to spend the night in the playhouse, quite a lot... You were always well chaperoned, at least to a point. What I mean is you always could sneak out. Remember the books we read? And we’d put an Elsie Dinsmore cover on the Sheik of Araby, something like that..."

As a child, Mary Reynolds went to a small private school within Reynolda Village on the estate, and eventually went on to Salem Academy to further her education. This was later followed by schooling at Miss Wright's School, a girl's finishing school in Bryn Mawr, Pennsylvania. After graduating she went to Paris and studied art, a passion of hers. 

In 1924, Katharine gave birth to a half-sibling of the Reynolds children, J. Johnston Jr. She suddenly died 3 days later of an embolism. The estate was then held in trust by the new guardians of her children, J. Johnston and Will Reynolds, R.J. Reynolds' brother. Estate workers were kept on to upkeep the property for the Reynolds' children's use. The children began the vacate the house as they grew older. R.J. Reynolds Jr. moved to New York to run his aviation business; Smith Reynolds was sent to attend Woodberry Forest School in Virginia. In December 1929, Mary Reynolds married Charles Henry Babcock, son of an investment banking family from Philadelphia. The wedding ceremony was performed at Reynolda in front of the fireplace in the main hall; in January 1930, her sister Nancy married in the same spot. The Babcocks set up their main residence in Greenwich, Connecticut, returning to Reynolda for vacations or holidays. 

In 1932, Babcock and her siblings rushed back to Winston-Salem at the news of their brother Smith's death. 

In 1936, her father, R.J. Reynolds, left her an inheritance of thirty million dollars. At this point in her life, she was considered to be one of the wealthiest women in the world. With this money, she made many donations to various causes with a focus on local education.

After moving permanently to the estate, Babcock became increasingly concerned about rising costs of maintenance. Winston-Salem's city limits were redrawn in 1940, now including Reynolda. The family worried over the new burden of city taxes. Babcock wrote to her sister Nancy: "Mary wrote to her sister, Nancy, that “we all know that the day of big estates is passing. I’m planning to sell off the church side of the road right after the war in pieces, selling as much as the town can absorb. Property around the Old Town Club will be sold after that, probably 10 or 12 years later. But the big house and gardens etc. are what cause upkeep expense."

Originally, Babcock envisioned selling 500 acres to establish a veterans hospital, but the idea was met with ire. In a letter to her sister, she wrote: "Everyone I asked blew up over Reynolda becoming a vets’ hospital...I guess Reynolda will go on to live a longer life and end as an ancient ruin.” When the Z. Smith Reynolds Foundation offered Wake Forest University annual financial assistance in return for the college moving to Winston-Salem, she donated the initial 350 acres for the new university's grounds, eventually to a total gift of 605 acres. A groundbreaking ceremony for the new campus was held in 1951 and attended by President Harry S. Truman, who gave the keynote speech of the day. A lunch reception was held in Reynolda's central reception room; afterwards President Truman took a nap on the sofa of R.J. Reynolds' study.

Legacy
Babcock died of stomach cancer in 1953. She died in New York City and was buried in Winston-Salem at the Reynolds family plot in Salem Cemetery.

One of Babcock's most notable philanthropist donations was the initial gift of land from the family estate for the relocation of Wake Forest University. From 1952 to 1956, 14 buildings were constructed on the Winston-Salem campus. The school was officially moved to Winston-Salem in the summer of 1956.

Mary Reynolds Babcock started the Z. Smith Reynolds Foundation, which was established in 1933 after the death of her brother, Zachary Smith Reynolds. It had a broad mandate to support the 'betterment of mankind and furtherance of the public welfare'. Upon her death in 1953, her will provided twelve million dollars for the establishment of the Mary Reynolds Babcock Foundation, a philanthropic organization for the benefit of North Carolinians, particularly to "help people and places to move out of poverty and achieve greater social and economic justice."

By the 1960s, both foundations were controlled by interlocking boards composed primarily of Reynolds family members, including Charles (Charlie) H. Babcock, Mary Reynolds's husband; R.J. Reynolds Jr.; and Anne Reynolds Forsyth, Zachary Smith Reynold's daughter from his first marriage. In the 1960s, the Reynolds' wealth had passed into the hands of a second generation of family members who were far removed from the political and economic struggles of the workplace.  They played no role in the day-to-day management of Reynolds Tobacco.  They took their cues instead from the culture of mid-twentieth-century American philanthropy, which puts its faith in social engineering and the use of private wealth to advance the common welfare.  Some examples include Alliance for Appalachia, Blueprint NC, and Federation of Child Care Centers of Alabama.

References

Reynolds family
1908 births
1953 deaths
20th-century American philanthropists